Kinesin family member 27 (KIF27), also known as kinesin-4, is a human protein encoded by the KIF27 gene. It is part of the kinesin family of motor proteins.

References